Triplicate is a studio album by British jazz bassist Dave Holland released on the ECM label in 1988. It features Holland in a trio with alto saxophonist Steve Coleman and drummer Jack DeJohnette.

Background
It was the first album to be released by Dave Holland following the dissolving of his first working quintet that had featured Steve Coleman, Robin Eubanks, Kenny Wheeler and Marvin "Smitty" Smith. Coleman was the sole member to be remain for this session while the drum chair was filled by Jack DeJohnette, who had worked extensively with Holland in the bands of Miles Davis, Chick Corea and Gateway.

Reception
The Allmusic review by Scott Yanow awarded the album 4 stars, calling it a "well-rounded date".

Tyran Grillo of Between Sound and Space wrote "Triplicate is a fantastic (surprise, surprise) trio album that joins bassist Dave Holland with altoist Steve Coleman and rhythmatist Jack DeJohnette... Triplicate is not an in-your-face album but one wrought with careful language. It avoids the danger of expletives in search of a clean melodic line. One imagines that if this album were alive, the audience would be whooping and clapping all the same, but in the studio a certain cleanliness of sound wins over. This has its pros and cons, depending on your preferences, but either way we can step outside of this record knowing we’ve just experienced something joyous."

Track listing
All tunes written by Dave Holland, except as noted.
 "Games" (Steve Coleman) - 5:04
 "Quiet Fire" - 5:47
 "Take The Coltrane" (Duke Ellington) - 6:24
 "Rivers Run" - 9:14
 "Four Winds" - 4:18
 "Triple Dance" - 8:05
 "Blue" (Jack DeJohnette) - 6:06
 "African Lullaby" (Traditional, arr. Dave Holland) - 3:08
 "Segment" (Charlie Parker) - 6:34
Recorded at the Power Station, New York in  March 1988

Notes
 The tune “Four Winds” was originally recorded by Holland on his 1972 debut album on the ECM record label.
 The tune “Rivers Run” is dedicated to composer and multi-instrumentalist Sam Rivers.
 “Rivers Run” was re-recorded by Holland on his 2008 sextet album, Pass It On.

Personnel
Steve Coleman – alto saxophone
Dave Holland – double bass
Jack DeJohnette – drums

References

External links

Dave Holland albums
1988 albums
ECM Records albums